Saki Igarashi is a Japanese freestyle wrestler. At the 2018 Asian Wrestling Championships held in Bishkek, Kyrgyzstan, she won the gold medal in the women's 55 kg event.

In 2018, she won the gold medal at the World U23 Wrestling Championship in the 55 kg event. In 2019, at the World U23 Wrestling Championship held in Budapest, Hungary she won the silver medal in the 55 kg event.

She won the silver medal in the women's 55 kg event at the 2019 Asian Wrestling Championships held in Xi'an, China.

References

External links 
 

Living people
Year of birth missing (living people)
Place of birth missing (living people)
Japanese female sport wrestlers
Asian Wrestling Championships medalists
21st-century Japanese women